Rudolf Jettmar (10 September 1869, Tarnów — 21 April 1939, Vienna) was an Austrian painter and printmaker.

The largest collection of the work of Rudolf Jettmar in the United States is held by the Jack Daulton Collection in Los Altos Hills, California.

Further reading 
 Hofstätter, Hans H. "Jettmar, Rudolf." In Grove Art Online. Oxford Art Online, (accessed February 4, 2012; subscription required).

References

External links 
 
 Entry for Rudolf Jettmar on the Union List of Artist Names

19th-century Austrian painters
19th-century Austrian male artists
Austrian male painters
20th-century Austrian painters
1869 births
1939 deaths
Austrian printmakers
People from Tarnów
20th-century printmakers
20th-century Austrian male artists